In 1997, with support from The McKnight Foundation, a group of non-profit organizations led by Trailnet formed a partnership to plan and implement the Confluence Greenway. The Confluence Greenway was planned as a  system of parks, conservation and recreation areas located in the St. Louis, Missouri metropolitan area. Various parks, trails, and attractions are located along forty miles of both the Missouri and Illinois banks of the Mississippi River and Missouri River.

Background
The greenway connects the confluence of the Mississippi and Missouri rivers to the St. Louis Riverfront.

In 2014 the Confluence Greenway plan became part of the Mississippi Greenway plan managed by Great Rivers Greenway.

See also
Great Rivers Greenway District

References

External links
Confluence Greenway

Nature conservation in the United States
Protected areas on the Mississippi River
Missouri River
Geography of Greater St. Louis